Amerino J. "Moody" Sarno (September 21, 1914 – November 9, 1997) was an American football player and coach.  An All-American at Fordham University, he played on the same offensive line as future Pro Football Hall of Famer Vince Lombardi. On March 30, 1941, he was hired as Boston College's line coach. He became the Eagles head coach in 1943 after head coach Denny Myers joined the United States Navy. Sarno himself was the only member of the Boston College coaching staff not to join the United States Armed Forces. In three seasons as head coach at Boston College, he had an 11–7–1 record, including an unbeaten 1943 season. He later served as head coach at his former school, Everett High School in Everett, Massachusetts, from 1955 to 1982. In 28 seasons at Everett, he finished with a 128–116–11 record and won four state championships (1961, 1962, 1964, 1965).

Head coaching record

College

References

1914 births
1997 deaths
American football tackles
Boston College Eagles football coaches
Boston Shamrocks (AFL) players
Fordham Rams football players
High school football coaches in Massachusetts
Sportspeople from Boston
Sportspeople from Everett, Massachusetts
Players of American football from Boston